12 Storeys (十二樓 or Shí'èr lóu in Mandarin) is a 1997 Singaporean drama film written and directed by Eric Khoo. It features an ensemble cast of Jack Neo, Koh Boon Pin and Quan Yi Fong. It was screened in the Un Certain Regard section at the 1997 Cannes Film Festival.

Plot
The film follows a day in the lives of several households living within the same HDB block.

A soup vendor called Ah Gu is having a hard time dealing with his Mainland Chinese wife, Lily. San San, an overweight loner, is haunted by her feelings of isolation and the memory of her deceased mother. Meng, Trixie and Tee are siblings left to their own devices when their parents go on holiday.

Cast
 Jack Neo as Ah Gu
 Koh Boon Pin as Meng
 Quan Yi Fong (credited as Chuang Yi Fong) as Lily
 Lum May Yee as Trixie
 Lucilla Teoh as San San
 Ritz Lim as Spirit
 Roderick Lim as Tee
 Ronald Toh Chee Kong as Eddy
 Loy Lok Yee as Mother 
 Tan Kheng Hua as Spirit's Mother 
 Neo Swee Lin as Rachel
 Lim Kay Siu as Hawker
 Lim Kay Tong as Mark

Reception
Derek Elley of Variety wrote that the film's has "genuinely funny" moments, but its slow pacing "blunts the humor".  Time Out called it "witty and sophisticated stuff".

Singapore's Ministry of Foreign Affairs said that it "is widely regarded to have contributed to the revitalisation of local cinema".

References

External links

Zhao Wei Films

1997 films
1997 comedy-drama films
Singaporean comedy-drama films
1990s English-language films
Films directed by Eric Khoo